Future Cop is an American crime drama television series that starred Ernest Borgnine and Michael J. Shannon. It was based on the TV movie of the same name and predated RoboCop by ten years. The series was aired on ABC in 1977 and was re-piloted as Cops and Robin on NBC in 1978. A veteran street cop gets an experimental android that has been programmed by the police lab for his new partner.

Cast
Ernest Borgnine – Off. Joe Cleaver
Michael J. Shannon – Off. John Haven
John Amos – Off. Bill Bundy

Episodes

TV Movie (1976)

Season 1

List of Cops and Robin episodes with airdates
 "Cops and Robin" (March 28, 1978)

Plagiarism lawsuit
Writers Harlan Ellison and Ben Bova filed a lawsuit against Paramount Television, ex-Paramount exec Terry Keegan, and ABC-TV, alleging that Future Cop was plagiarized from their own pitch for a TV series, which was based on their 1970 short story "Brillo."  The lawsuit was settled in 1980, awarding Ellison and Bova $182,500 in compensatory damages and $154,500 in punitive damages.  The story's title was allegedly a pun, as a robot policeman could be referred to as "steel fuzz", like Brillo soap pads.

Home media
On March 1, 2016, Mill Creek Entertainment released the complete series on DVD in Region 1.

See also
To date, there have been five other short-lived American TV series with identical premises:
 Holmes & Yoyo (1976)
 Automan (1983)
 Mann & Machine (1992)
 Total Recall 2070 (1999)
 Almost Human (2013)

References

External links

American Broadcasting Company original programming
1970s American crime drama television series
1970s American science fiction television series
1977 American television series debuts
1977 American television series endings
Television series about robots
English-language television shows
Television series by CBS Studios